Dyon Gijzen (born 16 February 1994 in Roermond) is a Dutch professional footballer who plays as a forward for EHC.

References

External links
 Voetbal International profile 
 
 Dyon Gijzen at Fupa

1994 births
Living people
Dutch footballers
Dutch expatriate footballers
VVV-Venlo players
MVV Maastricht players
De Treffers players
Germania Teveren players
EHC Hoensbroek players
Eerste Divisie players
Tweede Divisie players
People from Roermond
Dutch expatriate sportspeople in Belgium
Dutch expatriate sportspeople in Germany
Expatriate footballers in Belgium
Expatriate footballers in Germany
Association football forwards
Footballers from Limburg (Netherlands)